C. Krishnan is an Indian politician from the state of Kerala, and a member of the Legislative Assembly of Kerala. He represents the Payyanur constituency of Kerala and is a member of the Communist Party of India (Marxist)(CPI(M)).

References

External links 
 C Krishnan at Facebook

1949 births
Living people
Communist Party of India (Marxist) politicians from Kerala
Kerala MLAs 2016–2021
People from Kannur district